Elliott Sullivan (July 4, 1907 – June 2, 1974) was an American actor.

Sullivan was born in San Antonio, Texas, the son of Rabbi Solomon Solomon.

He appeared in the films They Won't Forget, Over the Wall, Accidents Will Happen, Gangs of New York, Racket Busters, Next Time I Marry, King of the Underworld, They Made Me a Criminal, The Man Who Dared, Indianapolis Speedway, The Spellbinder, Smashing the Money Ring, The Saint's Double Trouble, An Angel from Texas, The Man Who Talked Too Much, Millionaires in Prison, Calling All Husbands, Unholy Partners, Johnny Eager, Wild Bill Hickok Rides, The Man with Two Lives, This Gun for Hire, You Can't Escape Forever, G-Men vs. the Black Dragon, A Gentle Gangster, Action in the North Atlantic, Whistling in Brooklyn, The Lady Gambles, Guilty Bystander, The Sergeant, The Desperados, Tropic of Cancer, Fear Is the Key, The Great Gatsby and The Spikes Gang, among others.

In 1929, he got his first Broadway walk‐on role in Morris Gest's presentation of “The Passion Play”.
Broadway plays in which Sullivan appeared included Hamlet (1961), The Octoroon (1961), The Plough and the Stars (1960), She Stoops to Conquer (1960), Henry IV, Part II (1960), Henry IV, Part I (1960), Peer Gynt (1960), Lysistrata (1959), The Great God Brown (1959), The Power and the Glory (1958), Compulsion (1957), Brigadoon (1957), Small War on Murray Hill (1957), Brigadoon (1947), Skydrift (1945), Winged Victory (1943), Lysistrata (1930), and Red Rust (1929).

In 1956, Sullivan was indicted for contempt of Congress after he appeared as an unfriendly witness before the House Un-American Activities Committee. He was acquitted of that charge in 1961.

Sullivan moved to London in 1962, joined British Actors Equity, and acted in productions in Europe.

Sullivan died on June 2, 1974, in Los Angeles, California at age 66.

Selected filmography

Fury Below (1936) - Coal Miner
San Quentin (1937) - Convict (uncredited)
Kid Galahad (1937) - Photographer in Nightclub (uncredited)
They Won't Forget (1937) - Luther Clay
Mr. Dodd Takes the Air (1937) - Taxi Driver (uncredited)
Love Is on the Air (1937) - First Henchman (uncredited)
Alcatraz Island (1937) - First Convict in Cell (uncredited)
Submarine D-1 (1937) - Man from S-62 (uncredited)
Missing Witnesses (1937) - 2nd Aviator (uncredited)
Wells Fargo (1937) - Minor Role (uncredited)
A Slight Case of Murder (1938) - Beer Salesman (uncredited)
Over the Wall (1938) - Chic Metzer - Henchman (uncredited)
Accidents Will Happen (1938) - Burley Thorne
Gangs of New York (1938) - Hopkins
Racket Busters (1938) - Charlie Smith
The Sisters (1938) - Second Sailor (uncredited)
Angels with Dirty Faces (1938) - Cop (uncredited)
Next Time I Marry (1938) - Red
Devil's Island (1939) - Gate Guard (uncredited)
King of the Underworld (1939) - Mugsy
The Great Man Votes (1939) - Cement Man (uncredited)
They Made Me a Criminal (1939) - Mel - Hoodlum Stealing $50 (uncredited)
Nancy Drew... Reporter (1939) - Pedestrian (uncredited)
The Oklahoma Kid (1939) - McCord's Henchman (uncredited)
The Man Who Dared (1939) - Slug (uncredited)
Bachelor Mother (1939) - Bouncer at 'The Pink Slipper' (uncredited)
They All Come Out (1939) - Sheriff (uncredited)
Indianapolis Speedway (1939) - Jimmy, Ted's Mechanic (uncredited)
Waterfront (1939) - Committee Man (uncredited)
Each Dawn I Die (1939) - Convict (uncredited)
The Spellbinder (1939) - Harry 'Ice Box' Swinnerty
Smashing the Money Ring (1939) - Danny Galloway
On Dress Parade (1939) - Leader at Position H4 (uncredited)
The Roaring Twenties (1939) - Eddie's Cellmate (uncredited)
That's Right—You're Wrong (1939) - Hood (uncredited)
Brother Rat and a Baby (1940) - Garage Man with Invoice (uncredited)
The Saint's Double Trouble (1940) - Monk
An Angel from Texas (1940) - Garvey - Davis Henchman (uncredited)
The Man Who Talked Too Much (1940) - Bill
Millionaires in Prison (1940) - Tony Brody
Calling All Husbands (1940) - Chunky
City for Conquest (1940) - Photographer (uncredited)
Behind the News (1940) - Thug (uncredited)
Where Did You Get That Girl? (1941) - Cab Driver (uncredited)
Flight from Destiny (1941) - Cab Driver #2 (uncredited)
Father's Son (1941) - Gus' Pal (uncredited)
Andy Hardy's Private Secretary (1941) - Service Station Man #2 (uncredited)
Knockout (1941) - East Side Pug (uncredited)
Sis Hopkins (1941) - Attendant (uncredited)
Ziegfeld Girl (1941) - Second Truck Driver (uncredited)
The People vs. Dr. Kildare (1941) - Taxi Driver at Mike's (uncredited)
Blossoms in the Dust (1941) - Note Collector (uncredited)
Manpower (1941) - Lineman at Cafe Counter (uncredited)
Navy Blues (1941) - Shore Patrolman #2 (uncredited)
Honky Tonk (1941) - Candy's Man (uncredited)
Blues in the Night (1941) - Waiter #2 at The Jungle (uncredited)
Unholy Partners (1941) - Eddie - in Miami (uncredited)
Johnny Eager (1941) - Ed Nolan (uncredited)
Mr. District Attorney (1941) - Detective (uncredited)
Wild Bill Hickok Rides (1942) - Bart Hanna (Credits) / Mr. Harris
A Tragedy at Midnight (1942) - Cop (uncredited)
The Man with Two Lives (1942) - Eric
In This Our Life (1942) - Worker (uncredited)
This Gun for Hire (1942) - Officer Glennon (uncredited)
Yankee Doodle Dandy (1942) - Army Recruiter Examiner (uncredited)
Escape from Crime (1942) - Prison Clerk with Prison Number (uncredited)
You Can't Escape Forever (1942) - Mooch - Greer's Henchman (uncredited)
Lucky Jordan (1942) - 1st Soldier (uncredited)
G-Men vs. the Black Dragon (1943, Serial) - Turner (uncredited)
Calaboose (1943) - Henchman (uncredited)
Taxi, Mister (1943) - Man Slapped Around by Louie (uncredited)
A Gentle Gangster (1943) - Lefty
Action in the North Atlantic (1943) - Hennessy (uncredited)
Crime Doctor (1943) - Detective with Hat (uncredited)
Whistling in Brooklyn (1943) - Henchman Dutch (uncredited)
The Story of Dr. Wassell (1944) - Naval Officer (uncredited)
The Last Ride (1944) - Tire Expert (uncredited)
An American Romance (1944) - Auto Workers' Spokesman (uncredited)
The Naked City (1948) - Wrestlers' Trainer (uncredited)
The Lady Gambles (1949) - Barky
Guilty Bystander (1950) - Stitch
So Young So Bad (1950) - Guard (uncredited)
Taxi (1953) - Delivery Man (uncredited)
Crowded Paradise (1956)
The Joker Is Wild (1957) - Nightclub Patron (uncredited)
Frozen Flashes (1967) - US General
The Dirty Dozen (1967) - Army officer at briefing (uncredited)
Ice Station Zebra (1968) - Bartender (uncredited)
The Sergeant (1968) - Pop Henneken
The Desperados (1969) - Jennison
On Her Majesty's Secret Service (1969) - American Guest (uncredited)
Tropic of Cancer (1970) - Peckover
The Revolutionary (1970)
Anne of Green Gables (1972) - Matthew Cuthbert
Fear Is the Key (1972) - Judge Mollison
The Great Gatsby (1974) - Wilson's Friend
The Spikes Gang (1974) - Billy
Vampyres (1974) - American Man

References

External links
 

1907 births
1974 deaths
20th-century American male actors
American male film actors
American male stage actors
Male actors from San Antonio